The Turduli Oppidani or Turdulorum Oppida (Latin: "oppidums of the Turduli" or "Strongholds of the Turduli"), were a pre-Roman La Tène culture coastal people in present-day Portugal, related to the Turduli Veteres and akin to the Lusitanians.

Location
They occupied the Portuguese region of Estremadura-Beira Litoral Province (coastal central Portugal), where they held the fortified towns (Oppida) of Aeminium (Coimbra), Conimbriga (Condeixa-a-Velha, near Coimbra), Coniumbriga (possibly Monte Meão), Collipo (S. Sebastião do Freixo, Batalha), Eburobrittium (Amoreira, Óbidos), and  Ierabriga (Alenquer).

History
An off-shot of the Turduli people, the Turduli Oppidani trekked northwards around the 5th century BC in conjunction with the Celtici and ended settling the present-day central coastal Portuguese Estremadura-Beira Litoral Province. 

The Oppidani seem to have become clients of the Lusitani sometime prior to the mid-3rd Century BC and then of Carthage at the latter part of the century.  Their history after the Second Punic War is less clear; is it almost certain that the Oppidani remained under Lusitani overlordship and bore the brunt of the first Roman thrusts into the Iberian northwest. In 138-136 BC Consul Decimus Junius Brutus devastated their lands in retaliation for them helping the Lusitani. 

The Oppidani were certainly defeated and technically included in Hispania Ulterior province by the praetor Publius Licinius Crassus in the wake of his campaign against the Lusitani and Celtici in 93 BC. Again the Turduli Oppidani and the Turduli Veteres suffered the same treatment in 61-60 BC, when they were incorporated into H. Ulterior by the Propraetor Julius Caesar.

Romanization
They were later aggregated by Emperor Augustus into the new Lusitania Province in 27-13 BC.

See also
Bardili (Turduli)
Cynetes
Turduli
Turduli Veteres 
Calaicians or Gallaeci
Pre-Roman peoples of the Iberian Peninsula

Notes

References

 Ángel Montenegro et alii, Historia de España 2 - colonizaciones y formación de los pueblos prerromanos (1200-218 a.C), Editorial Gredos, Madrid (1989) 
 Alberto José Lorrio Alvarado, Los Celtíberos, Universidad Complutense de Madrid, Murcia (1997) 
 Francisco Burillo Mozota, Los Celtíberos, etnias y estados, Crítica, Barcelona (1998, revised edition 2007) 
 Jorge de Alarcão, O Domínio Romano em Portugal, Publicações Europa-América, Lisboa (1988) 
 Jorge de Alarcão et alii, De Ulisses a Viriato – O primeiro milénio a.C., Museu Nacional de Arqueologia, Instituto Português de Museus, Lisboa (1996) 
 Luis Berrocal-Rangel, Los pueblos célticos del soroeste de la Península Ibérica, Editorial Complutense, Madrid (1992)

External links
Detailed map of the Pre-Roman Peoples of Iberia (around 200 BC)

Tribes of Lusitania
Ancient peoples of Portugal
Tribes conquered by Rome